Fairphone is a Dutch electronics manufacturer and social enterprise that designs and produces smartphones with the goal of having a lower environmental footprint and better social impact than is common in the industry. In particular, the company aims to minimize the use of conflict minerals in its devices, maintain fair labor conditions for its workforce and suppliers, and allow users to maintain their own devices. The company was founded in 2013 as a social enterprise with the support of the Waag Society, and is based in Amsterdam, the Netherlands.

, the company's most recent model is the Fairphone 4, a modular smartphone which supports 5G connectivity, has dual 48MP cameras with optical image stabilization, an IP54 rating and MIL810G drop test certification. It is only sold in Europe. The purpose of modularity is to make the phone easily repairable and customisable by the user, and therefore longer-lasting. According to the company, increasing the lifespan of a phone by two years reduces CO₂ emissions by 30%.

History 

Fairphone was founded by Bas van Abel, Tessa Wernink and Miquel Ballester as a social enterprise company in January 2013, having existed as a campaign for two and a half years. The company states on its website that it "designs and produces smartphones with minimal harm to society and the environment".

In April 2015 the company became a registered B Corporation.

Since version two the Fairphone is produced in Suzhou, China, by Hi-P International Limited.

Fairphone's founder Bas van Abel acknowledged in 2017 that it was currently impossible to produce a 100% fair phone, suggesting it was more accurate to call his company's phones "fairer".

As of February 2022, Fairphone had sold around 400,000 devices.

Products

Price
The Fairphones are priced in the middle of the range of mobile phone prices; for example, the Fairphone 4 in 2022 was priced from €579.

Similar products
The Shiftphone is another small mobile telephone manufacturer with focus on sustainability, and also developed a modular smartphone. The founder of Shiftphone considers that the two companies working in collaboration could have more influence on bigger competitors.

Recognition and certifications 

In 2015, Fairphone – a certified benefit corporation – won the award for fastest-growing European tech startup at The Next Web conference.
Fairphone 2 was the first smartphone to be awarded with a 10/10 score at iFixit for repairability and the first mobile phone to receive Blue Angel certification.

In 2016, Fairphone's founder and first CEO Bas van Abel was one of the three recipients of the German Environmental Award.

In 2019, Fairphone won the Partnership Of The Year prize at the Responsible Business Awards.

Operating systems 
Fairphones can run several operating systems, including CalyxOS, DivestOS,  /e/, iodeOS, LineageOS, Ubuntu Touch, and more. Companies associated with e foundation also sell Fairphones with /e/ included, but Ron Amadeo at ars Technica in April 2020 warned /e/ users, "they'll most likely be on an old version of Android".

See also 
 Ethical consumerism
 Fair trade
 Green IT
 Open-source hardware
 Phonebloks
 Framework Computer

References

External links 

 

Fair trade brands
Smartphones
Mobile phone manufacturers
Manufacturing companies based in Amsterdam
Dutch brands
Modular smartphones
Social enterprises